Political Security Directorate (PSD) is an intelligence service of the Syrian government. It is divided into an Internal Security Department and an External Security Department. Intelligence division is affiliated to the Ministry of Interior. It is active against the Syrian opposition. It monitors political dissent and all media outlets. This intelligence service has been headed by Major General Ghaith Shafeeq Deeb since February 5, 2021.

Heads of Political Security Directorate 
 Ahmad Sa'id Salih (past - 1987)
 Adnan Badr Hassan (1987–2002)
 Ghazi Kanaan (2002–2004)
 Muhammad Mansoura (2004–2009)
Mohammed Dib Zaitoun (2009 – July 2012)
Rustum Ghazali (July 2012 – April 2015)
Head of Investigative branch: Brig. Gen. Makhmoud al-Khattib (2011). 
Head of Operations branch: Brig. Gen. Mohamed Heikmat Ibrahim (2011).
 Nasser Ali (April 2015–2017)
 Mohammad Khaled al-Rahmoun (2017–November 2018)

Regional Heads of Political Security Directorate 
Daraa branch: Atef Najib (2011), the European Union sanctioned him for "being responsible for the violence against protesters in Daraa during the Syrian uprising". He was replaced by Brig. Gen. Nasser Al-Ali.

Other Syrian intelligence agencies 
General Security Directorate
Military Intelligence Directorate
Air Force Intelligence Directorate

References

Syrian intelligence agencies